Fox College of Business is a private business college in Mississauga, Ontario, Canada.  Fox provides business programs including diploma, certificate, seminar, workshop and custom corporate training.  The motto of the college is "Stop at Perfection".

Academics 
Fox College of Business provides flexible learning methods to students. There is no minimum class requirement, the college provides one on one lecture without any additional cost.  The professors and instructors go to a student's company,  a hotel in the city where the student resides, local library, board of trade or any place suitable for the student. Students can also take advantage of distance learning so that they can work and study at the same time.  Fox College of Business groups its areas of study into four main categories: Accounting, Business, Language and Real Estate.

Accounting:
 Financial Analysis
 IFRS - International Financial Reporting Standards
 Management Accounting

Business:
 Business Law
 Entrepreneurship
 Management
 Marketing
 Professional Selling

Language:
 Business English
 ESL - English as a Second Language
 Legal English

Real Estate
 Feng Shui
 Commercial Leasing
 Lease Audit
 Property Management

Accreditation 

Fox College of Business is the only one business school in North America that provides real estate lease audit courses, some of their courses are accredited by the Association of Canadian Lease Auditors for their academic exemption.

Fox College of Business is an accredited course provider of the Registered Insurance Brokers of Ontario (RIBO).  Some of their courses qualify for RIBO principal brokers or licensed individuals continuing education requirements. It is also an Approved Education Provider by the Registrar, REBBA 2002  to provide continuing education to real estate agents registered in Ontario.

The college is exempted from registration as legally required by the Ontario Ministry of Training, Colleges and Universities.

The college is certified by the Human Resources and Skills Development Canada; some courses are eligible for tuition tax credit.

While the minimum qualification of an instructor in a private career college require by the government  is 48 months of occupational experience in the vocation for which instruction is given (without any academic requirement); Fox requires all its professors and instructors to hold either a master's degree related to the field they teach, or a bachelor's degree plus a professional designation in the subject they are specialized.

Affiliation 
The college is the first TOLES  examination centre in North America and provides courses for TOLES Foundation, TOLES Higher and TOLES Advanced examinations.

The college cooperates with York Education (HK) Institute  to offer real estate diploma program in Hong Kong.

Controversy
In early 2009, its founders Bryan Law suggested that Payment should also be one of the elements of Marketing Mix, and Fox College of Business becomes an advocate for promoting Payment as the newest element of Marketing Mix. This suggestion became a controversial issue among the professors and instructors in the college and the marketing field.  Some argued that Payment should be part of the Process, while some believed that it was actually derived from Place. The supporters believe that Payment plays a crucial role in marketing, as ease and security of transactions are crucial in selling products and services, especially in this cyber age.

Mascot 

The college mascot is Robot Fox; a robot in the shape of a fox who can speak human languages. The color of Robot Fox is blue with yellow eyes as the college colors are blue and yellow. The logo of the Robot Fox is a fox head in blue with yellow eyes and a micro chip in its forehead to show it is a robot.

See also
 College (Canada)
 Education in Canada
 Higher education in Canada
 Higher education in Ontario

References

External links
 Official site of Fox College of Business

Private colleges in Ontario
2007 establishments in Ontario
Educational institutions established in 2007